Song Machine, Season One: Strange Timez is the seventh studio album by British virtual band Gorillaz, released on 23 October 2020 via Parlophone and Warner Bros. Records. The album is released as part of Gorillaz' Song Machine project, a web series consisting of a collection of singles and music videos, dubbed "episodes" each featuring different guest artists.  The album marked the return of the character Murdoc Niccals in promotional material, after his absence from The Now Now in 2018. The record received positive reviews from music critics.

Background
On 28 January 2020, the band officially released images via social media teasing a concept entitled Song Machine.  A 23-second promotional single entitled "Song Machine Theme Tune" was released on streaming services with an accompanying video.
Damon Albarn and Remi Kabaka Jr spoke to BBC Radio 1's Annie Mac for the official premiere, saying that Song Machine "may have an obtuse narrative arc at the end of each season, but it's more Ozark, than Designated Survivor. You just keep going until you run out of ideas."

Upon the premiere of Episode One on 30 January, Albarn revealed that the group had been in the studio with Schoolboy Q among others, although he did say that these songs were likely to be saved for future series of Song Machine.
A press release was put out to explain Song Machine further, with virtual Gorillaz member Russel Hobbs saying: "Song Machine is a whole new way of doing what we do, Gorillaz breaking the mould 'cos the mould got old. World is moving faster than a supercharged particle, so we've gotta stay ready to drop. We don't even know who's stepping through the studio next. Song Machine feeds on the unknown, runs on pure chaos. So whatever the hell's coming, we're primed and ready to produce like there's no tomorrow."

Episode Two released on 27 February 2020. Despite an initially revealed monthly schedule, no singles were released in March due to the spike of the COVID-19 pandemic. On March 24, the band released a statement via Instagram, reassuring fans that despite "serious times" Song Machine would proceed. Episode Three was then released on 9 April.

On 2 May, a standalone single called "How Far?" was released without any prior announcement in the middle of Season One's release schedule as a tribute to Tony Allen, who died on 30 April, and was a frequent collaborator with Albarn. As a result, Episode Four, originally teased to be up next at the end of the music video for Aries, delayed its release to 9 June. On 13 June, the album was revealed on the Gorillaz website under the name Almanac CD, said to be a 10 track album that would be packaged with the Gorillaz Almanac in October 2020.

After the premiere of Episode Five on 20 July, it was stated that the project would commence a brief hiatus, lasting until an unspecified date in September. On 7 September, it was revealed the band's next single would be titled "Strange Timez", and would feature Robert Smith. Episode Six, the first of the singles to have had its music fully recorded during the pandemic, was released on 9 September, alongside the announcement of the album's title and tracklist.

Episode Seven was released on 1 October. Episode Eight was released on 5 November. Episode Nine was released on 24 December; unlike previous Song Machine releases, the song was not released as a single.

Musical style
Critics have primarily described the record as alternative rock, hip hop, and electronic music. Critics have also noted throughout the album pop, punk rock, indie rock, electropop, psychedelic pop, R&B, funk, soul, bossa nova, reggae, acid house, and downtempo in various specified tracks.

Soey Kim of Vogue commented that the record "is an ambitious and chaotic amalgamation of sounds and genres", and further specified that the sound ranged from "punk rock to R&B to hip-hop." Thomas Smith of NME also noted the album's stylistic diversity, stating that the record is a "varied affair that pulls from Albarn and the band's perchance [sic] for exploration: punk rock sits effortlessly next to glitzy piano ballads, while playful hip-hop and melancholic post-rave ambience soothe our pounding heads."

Critical reception

Song Machine, Season One: Strange Timez received generally positive reviews from critics on Metacritic, which assigns a normalized rating out of 100 to reviews from professional publications, the release received an average score of 81, based on 15 reviews, indicating "universal acclaim". Aggregator AnyDecentMusic? gave the album a 7.6 out of 10, based on their assessment of the critical consensus.

In a positive review, The Guardians Alexis Petridis lauded the album’s guest artists, stating "It's not just that the guests demonstrate Albarn's excellent taste in music, although they do – from St Vincent to Octavian to Georgia to Unknown Mortal Orchestra, at least in the deluxe edition tracks – it's what he chooses to do with their voices." Consequence of Sounds Jordan Blum also praised the guest artists, commenting that the album "encapsulates Gorillaz's trademark tongue-in-cheek bizarreness, stylistic flexibility, and enticing incorporation of guest musicians." Blum also praised the album's pacing, stating that the album "flows very smoothly nonetheless, maintaining fluid pacing while also shifting styles with consistent regularity."

Track listing
All tracks are written by Damon Albarn, Remi Kabaka Jr., and the tracks' respective  and produced by Gorillaz and Remi Kabaka Jr., except where noted.

Notes
  indicates an additional producer
  indicates a co-producer

Personnel
Credits adapted from the liner notes and Tidal.

Gorillaz
 Damon Albarn – production , vocals , keyboards , bass , guitar , drum programming , synthesizer , backing vocals, drums, percussion , piano , melodica 
 Jamie Hewlett – artwork, design
 Remi Kabaka Jr. – production , drum programming , percussion , drums 
 Stephen Sedgwick – mixing , engineering 
 John Davis – mastering 
 Samuel Egglenton – engineering 
 James Ford – production, drums, percussion , keyboards , guitar , synthesizer, drum programming , balafon, zither 

Additional musicians

 Robert Smith – vocals, guitar, keyboards, bass guitar, music box 
 Etta Albarn Teulon – trumpet , additional vocals 
 Beck – vocals 
 Rudy Albarn – drums , percussion 
 Leee John – vocals 
 Schoolboy Q – vocals 
 Prince Paul – backing vocals 
 John Smythe – guitar 
 Weathrman – bass, keyboards, synthesizer 
 St. Vincent – vocals, keyboards 
 Elton John – vocals, piano 
 6lack – vocals 
 Peter Hook – bass 
 Georgia – drums, percussion 
 P2J – drum programming 
 Octavian – vocals 
 Kano – vocals 
 Roxani Arias – vocals 
 Mike Will Made It – drum programming 
 Fatoumata Diawara – vocals 
 Voice Messengers – backing vocals 
 Alice Pratley – violin 
 Ciara Ismail – violin 
 Davide Rossi – strings, string arranger 
 Izzi Dunn – cello 
 Nicola Hicks – viola 
 Sébastien Blanchon – horn 
 Slowthai – vocals 
 Slaves – vocals, guitar, drums 
 Mike Dean – drum programming 
 EarthGang – vocals 
 Roberto Fonseca – piano 
 Joan As Police Woman – vocals, erhu, guitar, keyboards, upright bass 
 GoldLink – vocals 
 Unknown Mortal Orchestra – vocals, bells 
 Moonchild Sanelly – vocals 
 JPEGMafia – vocals 
 Chai – vocals, keyboards, drums 
 Tony Allen – vocals, drums 
 Skepta – vocals 
 Kotono Sato – violin 
 Stella Page – viola 

Additional technical

 Robert Smith – production 
 David Greenbaum – engineering 
 Dylan Herman – engineering 
 Elvin "Wit" Shahbazian – engineering 
 Paul Huston – production, engineering 
 Annie Clark – engineering 
 Ricardo Valentine Jr. – engineering 
 Matt Doughty – engineering 
 Richard Isong – additional production 
 Michael Williams II – production 
 Marzeratti – production 
 Darryle "Rell" Gayle – engineering 
 Adrien Libmann – engineering 
 Andrea Fognini – engineering 
 Davide Lasala – engineering 
 Sylvain Mercier – engineering 
 Nora Fedrigo – engineering 
 Mike Dean – co-production 
 Raul Chirinos – engineering 
 Joan Wasser – production 
 Ruban Nielson – engineering 
 Osamu Shu Imamoto – engineering 
 Stuart Lowbridge – track sequencing

Additional artwork
 Stars Redmond – assistance

Notes
  "Voice Messengers" consist of Sylvain Bellegarde, Emmanuel Laniece, Augustin Ledieu, Vanina de Franco, and Neima Naouri

Charts

Weekly charts

Year-end charts

References

2020 albums
Gorillaz albums
Parlophone albums
Albums recorded at Studio 13
Warner Records albums
Albums produced by Damon Albarn
Albums produced by James Ford (musician)
Albums produced by Mike Will Made It
Albums produced by Mike Dean (record producer)
Albums produced by Prince Paul (producer)
Song Machine